Chanali may refer to:
 Chanali, Zahedan,  a village in Sistan and Baluchestan Province, Iran
 Chenali, a village in Hormozgan Province, Iran
 Chinali language, or Chanali, a language of North India